Jyotiprasad Medhi  was a professor of statistics at Gauhati University and Institute of Advanced Study in Science and Technology.

Work and education
Medhi started his schooling in Dibrugarh and in 1940 he passed matriculation from Dibrugarh Government High School. After matriculation, he did his graduate studies in Cotton College in 1946 and was a gold medalist in BSc with Honours in mathematics. There he received the Sudmerson Gold Medal and Rajanikant Barat Gold Medal. Medhi did his MSc in Pure Mathematics from Calcutta University, and got the Debendra Nath Gangopadhaya Gold medal for record marks obtained and the Post graduate First class first gold medal in 1948. In 1952, he took a loan of ten thousand rupees from Govt of Assam and moved to England to pursue Master of Statistics (MStat) from the University of Manchester  and completed in 1954. He worked with M S Bartlett in the University of Manchester in 1955 on the topic 'Time Series Analysis'. Thereon Medhi moved to France to study for his DSc in the University of Paris in 1956 under the supervision of Robert Fortet. He had also taken a diploma in French Language with mention 'Honorable'. Its worthy to mention that he had written his doctoral thesis in French Language.

Medhi joined as a lecturer of statistics at Cotton University erstwhile Cotton College in 1948. However, in the same year Gauhati University was established and he was invited to work as professor in Gauhati University. Accepting the invitation, he joined the Department of Mathematics and Statistics as a lecturer. In between his tenure, he had taken MS degree from England and DSc from Paris. Medhi returned to Gauhati University where he became a professor and was the head of the department of statistics till he retired in 1985. Earlier in Gauhati University, both mathematics and statistics were in a common department, however, under the able leadership of Prof Medhi, statistics became a full-fledged individual department. In 1987, two years after retirement, he was entitled the honour of professor emeritus at the same university and remained so until his death in 2017. Under his guidance, several students got doctoral degrees and Tata Subba Rao is the first among them. From Southern India, Subba Rao had come to Assam to pursue his research under Prof Medhi and later he had joined Manchester University as a Professor. In 1979, he established the 'Population Research Centre' and served as a director. He played a prominent role in shaping the newly formed Institute of Advanced Study in Science and Technology, Assam, IASST by serving as director.

Publications

Medhi published many articles in peer reviewed international and national journals. He also published two books on stochastic processes each with over 500 citations.

Awards and honours

The J Medhi memorial lecture is annually held in the Indian Institute of Technology, Guwahati at the Department of Mathematics.
In 2016, Medhi was conferred an Honorary doctorate DSc by Tezpur University.

References 

1924 births
Indian statisticians
People from Assam
2017 deaths
Academic staff of Gauhati University
University of Paris alumni
Alumni of the University of Manchester
Queueing theory
Stochastic processes